The Haha  or  Iḥaḥan (in Shilha) (Ḥāḥā) is a Moroccan confederation of Berber tribes in the Western High Atlas in Morocco. They identify themselves as a tribal confederacy of the Chleuh people, and speak the Shilha language. Their region stretches along from the city of Essaouira south to the Souss Valley, mainly on the Atlantic coast.

References

See also 
 Masmuda

Berbers in Morocco
Berber peoples and tribes
Masmuda
Moroccan tribes
Confederations